Kenji Sekido (関戸 健二, born January 7, 1990) is a Japanese football player.

Club statistics
Updated to 10 August 2022.

References

External links

1990 births
Living people
Ryutsu Keizai University alumni
Association football people from Kanagawa Prefecture
Japanese footballers
J2 League players
Fagiano Okayama players
Association football midfielders